Theatre Jacksonville is a community theatre based in Jacksonville, Florida, United States. One of the oldest continually producing community theatres in the United States, its building, also known as the Little Theatre, was added to the National Register of Historic Places in 1991.

Theatre Jacksonville is based in the neighborhood of San Marco. It puts on numerous productions throughout the year and runs a children's camp called Camp Theatre Jacksonville every summer.

History
The Little Theatre company was founded at Jacksonville, Florida in 1919 and then incorporated as "The Little Theatre of Jacksonville" in 1926. Cigar magnate Carl Swisher financed a new building in the San Marco neighborhood (2032 San Marco Boulevard) in 1927. It took until January 4, 1938 for the first premiere to take place, namely Boy meets Girl.

In early 1969, the name of the company was changed to "Theatre Jacksonville, Inc." and the theatre was re-incorporated. Mayor Hans Tanzler issued a proclamation naming Theatre Jacksonville as Jacksonville's "Official Theatre" in 1972, a distinction reconfirmed by all succeeding mayors.

On July 12, 1991, the Little Theatre building was added to the U.S. National Register of Historic Places. The $500,000 Harold K. Smith Playhouse Endowment for facility maintenance was established in June, 1997. In October, 2000 the theatre Facade renovation was completed and the facility was formally dedicated as the Harold K. Smith Playhouse.

References

External links
 Official Theatre Jacksonville Website
 Duval County listings, Florida's Office of Cultural and Historical Programs

History of Jacksonville, Florida
National Register of Historic Places in Jacksonville, Florida
Jacksonville
Art Deco architecture in Florida
Jacksonville
Theatres on the National Register of Historic Places in Florida
1938 establishments in Florida